{{DISPLAYTITLE:C12H18O2}}
The molecular formula C12H18O2 (molar mass: 194.27 g/mol, exact mass: 194.1307 u) may refer to:

 2,5-Dimethoxy-p-cymene, or thymohydroquinone dimethyl ether
 Hexylresorcinol
 Sedanolide